Sinoe robiniella is a moth of the family Gelechiidae. It is found in North America, where it has been recorded from New York west to Indiana south to Mississippi and Arkansas.

The wingspan is 9−11.4 mm. The forewings range from brown to grey, with brownish black spots on the costa at the base, one-third and two-thirds. The subbasal fascia is dark brown and extends from the dorsum obliquely toward the middle of the costa. There are two small spots in the discal cell. The hindwings are light brown to grey. Adults are on wing from late April to September in the south and from late May to August in the north.

The larvae feed on Robinia pseudoacacia, Amorpha fruticosa and Gleditsia species.

References

Moths described in 1859
Litini